Michael Eder (born 23 May 1961) is a German alpine skier. He competed in the men's super-G at the 1988 Winter Olympics.

References

External links
 

1961 births
Living people
German male alpine skiers
Olympic alpine skiers of West Germany
Alpine skiers at the 1988 Winter Olympics
People from Berchtesgaden
Sportspeople from Upper Bavaria
20th-century German people